Birulia kishinouyei is a shrimp species in the genus Birulia. Its specific epithet is a tribute to the Japanese fisheries biologist Kamakichi Kishinouye (岸上 鎌吉, 1867–1929).

References

External links

Alpheoidea
Crustaceans described in 1930